The 1966–67 British Home Championship has remained famous in the memories of British Home Nations football fans ever since the dramatic climatic match at Wembley Stadium, where an unfancied Scottish team beat England on the same turf they had won the 1966 FIFA World Cup a year before. England had comfortably disposed of Wales and Ireland in the earlier matches, whilst Scotland had struggled, drawing with Wales and only just beating the Irish. In the final match however, the Scots outplayed their illustrious opponents who were effectively reduced to 10 men with Jack Charlton hobbling and no substitutes allowed claiming a 3–2 victory, thus becoming "World Champions" in the words of many enthusiastic Scottish supporters, who invaded and stole much of the pitch after the game. In contrast to later pitch invasions, this was non-violent and resulted in no significant police action. The "World Champions" idea has since taken more tangible form in the Unofficial Football World Championships.

The contest was also important as it formed the first half of the qualifying stages for the 1968 UEFA European Football Championship, a competition England would eventually qualify for in the following 1967–68 British Home Championship and reach the semi-finals, ultimately securing third position overall.

Table

Results

References

External links
Full Results and Line-ups

1967
1967 in British sport
1966–67 in Northern Ireland association football
1966–67 in English football
1966–67 in Welsh football
1966–67 in Scottish football
UEFA Euro 1968 qualifying
England at UEFA Euro 1968
England–Scotland football rivalry